Wayne Watson (born 26 March 1965) is a Jamaican former athlete who competed as a sprinter.

A product of Ferncourt High School in the town of Claremont, Jamaica, Watson was a college athlete in the United States, first for New York Tech and then Alabama A&M University in Huntsville, where he twice earned NCAA Division II All-American honors. In 2020 he joined the Huntsville-Madison County Athletic Hall of Fame.

Watson's competitive appearances included the 1989 World Indoor Championships, 1990 Goodwill Games, 1991 Pan American Games, 1991 World Championships, 1993 World Championships and two editions of the World University Games. He was third in the 100 metres at the 1990 Central American and Caribbean Games and also took bronze at the 1990 Commonwealth Games in Auckland as a member of the 4 × 100 metres relay team.

References

External links
Wayne Watson at World Athletics

1965 births
Living people
Jamaican male sprinters
NYIT Bears athletes
Alabama A&M Bulldogs and Lady Bulldogs athletes
College men's track and field athletes in the United States
World Athletics Championships athletes for Jamaica
Pan American Games competitors for Jamaica
Competitors at the 1990 Central American and Caribbean Games
Athletes (track and field) at the 1990 Commonwealth Games
Competitors at the 1990 Goodwill Games
Athletes (track and field) at the 1991 Pan American Games
Competitors at the 1991 Summer Universiade
Competitors at the 1993 Summer Universiade
Central American and Caribbean Games bronze medalists for Jamaica
Central American and Caribbean Games medalists in athletics
Commonwealth Games bronze medallists for Jamaica
Commonwealth Games medallists in athletics
Medallists at the 1990 Commonwealth Games